Arthur Phillip Baldwin, known as Phil Baldwin (April 4, 1942 – November 19, 2017) was an American boxer. He competed in the men's welterweight event at the 1960 Summer Olympics. He died on November 19, 2017, at the age of 75.

References

1942 births
2017 deaths
American male boxers
Olympic boxers of the United States
Boxers at the 1960 Summer Olympics
Sportspeople from Montgomery, Alabama
Welterweight boxers